Markus Keller may refer to:

 Markus Keller (triathlete) (born 1967), Swiss triathlete
 Markus Keller (ice hockey) (born 1989), German ice hockey goaltender
 Markus Keller (snowboarder) (born 1982), Swiss snowboarder